Dafen may refer to:

China
Dafen, Jiangxi (大汾镇), town in Suichuan County
Dafen, Shenzhen (大芬村), village in Buji Subdistrict, Longgang District

Wales
Dafen, Carmarthenshire, a village near Llanelli
Dafen (electoral ward)